Since their first match in 1971, 269 players have represented England in One Day Internationals (ODIs). A One Day International is an international cricket match between two representative teams, each having ODI status, as determined by the International Cricket Council (ICC). An ODI differs from Test matches in that the number of overs per team is limited, and that each team has only one innings. The first such match involved England and was played on 5 January 1971 between England and Australia. Where more than one player won his first ODI cap in the same match, those players are listed alphabetically by surname.

England have played 779 ODIs, resulting in 392 victories, 348 defeats, 9 ties and 30 no results.

Key

Players
Statistics are correct as of 6 March 2023.

Captains

Notes

References

England ODI
ODI